Geeste can mean the following:

Geeste, Emsland, a village in Lower Saxony, Germany
Geeste (river), one of the tributaries of the Weser River in Germany